Alexandra Andrea Coomber (née Hamilton; born 28 December 1973) is a British skeleton racer who competed in the late 1990s and early 2000s. She won the bronze medal in the women's skeleton event at the 2002 Winter Olympics in Salt Lake City, while competing with a broken wrist, having broken it in training 10 days prior to her race.

Coomber, who married in 2000, holds many records for achievements in the field of skeleton, won the first British Championship she entered, and was unbeaten at all other British championships. She won the women's Skeleton World Cup title three years in a row (1999–2000, 2000–1, 2001–2), a record listed in the Guinness Book of Records. Coomber is the only British athlete to have won three winter world cup series. During her career, she set track records at La Plagne, Lake Placid, and Nagano. She had been an Intelligence Officer of the Royal Air Force, and retired from competing in the skeleton in order to return to her previous profession. Coomber previously studied at Hertford College, Oxford.

Coomber also won a silver medal in the women's skeleton event at the 2001 FIBT World Championships in Calgary.

References

External links 
 
 

1973 births
Living people
English female skeleton racers
Olympic bronze medallists for Great Britain
Sportspeople from Somerset
Royal Air Force officers
Alumni of Hertford College, Oxford
Skeleton racers at the 2002 Winter Olympics
Women in the Royal Air Force
Olympic skeleton racers of Great Britain
Olympic medalists in skeleton
People educated at Our Lady of Sion School
Medalists at the 2002 Winter Olympics
Team Bath winter athletes